The China Christian Independent Church or the CCIC was an independent Chinese Christian organization established by Yu Guozhen in Shanghai in the early-20th century.

History 
The CCIC was established in 1906 as a Chinese organization upholding the three-self principles of self-governance, self-support, and self-propagation. In 1910, it established its own periodical The Chinese Christian, which was later renamed The Sacred News.

By 1924, it had 330 branch churches and over 20,000 Chinese Christian members. Many of its branches were former churches established by Presbyterian or Congregationalist missionaries, but wanting to be independent from foreign control.

References 

Christian denominations founded in China
Indigenous Christianity
Christian organizations established in 1906